A 15 year old girl from Maharashtra was gangraped and murdered by three Dalit men in the village Kopardi, in Ahmednagar district of Maharashtra. The victim's teeth and limb were broken and had bite marks all over her body. Millions of Marathas protested in Western Mahrastrian towns. Protests continued for six weeks against the rape murder. The three accused were convicted of the gangrape and murder.

References 

Crime in Maharashtra
2021 crimes in India
Violence against women in India
November 2021 events in India